Police Interceptors is a British factual programme that profiles the work of elite police units from across the UK. There have to date been 21 series to date following police units from Essex, South Yorkshire, Derbyshire, Cumbria, Lincolnshire, Durham and Cleveland, Cheshire and West Yorkshire. The current series follows the work of Nottinghamshire Police's Roads and Armed policing unit, as well as their dog unit.

The documentary has been broadcast by Channel 5 since the first episode on 9 May 2008. The show is produced by the same producers of the former Sky series Road Wars.

History
The first 3 series follows a police ANPR Intercept Team (now known as the Territorial Support Team) in Essex. Series 1 began on 9 May 2008 on Channel 5 (as Five) and ran for six weeks with an additional compilation episode. Series 2 began at 8pm on 10 October 2008 on Channel 5 and ran for twelve weeks with two additional compilation episodes. Series 3 began on 7 June 2010 on Five for 15 episodes.

The 4th series began on 13 June 2011 on Channel 5 and rode with South Yorkshire Police's Road Crime Unit for 8 weeks and returned in January 2012, this time following Derbyshire Police's Road Policing Unit.
Series 5, consisting of 10 episodes, began on 28 January 2013 and followed the Cumbria Constabulary's Roads Policing Unit. 
Series 6, 7 and 8 all consist of 10 episodes and followed the work of Lincolnshire Police's Road Policing, and Special Operations Units.

Series 9. 10 and 11 are based around the work of the collaborative Durham Constabulary and Cleveland Police's Specialist Operations Units.

Series 12 follows the work of the Cheshire Police Roads Policing Unit. Series 13 & 14 saw the Durham and Cleveland Special Operations Unit return as hosts in September 2017. Series 14 again follows the Durham Constabulary and Cleveland Police's Specialist Operations Units and began broadcasting on channel 5 on 30 April 2018. 

Police Interceptors returned for its 15th, 16th and 17th series in late 2018, March 2019 and October 2019 respectively, this time following a new police force, West Yorkshire Police's Roads Policing Unit (RPU), as well as other Specialist Operations Units. Series 18 is the current series and returned to observe the work of West Yorkshire Police RPUs on 12 October 2020.

Interceptor team
The series features the following police officers from across the UK involved in high-speed car chases following car thieves in stolen vehicles, speeding and drunken drivers. They use the latest high-speed police cars to follow and hunt down boy racers presenting a danger to the public. The Interceptors also use the latest number-plate reading technology (ANPR) to detect drivers without car insurance, often resulting in an argument with the driver and the disclosure of other crimes. The chases are often interspersed with light-hearted incidents involving the team's food breaks, harmless drunks and practical jokes in the incident room. The show often identifies officers by humorous nicknames and on-screen graphics feature data on their years in service, likes and dislikes.  Most incidents are tracked down by uniform officers from the Interceptor team but plain clothes and undercover police have also featured in the series.

Episodes

Ultimate Police Interceptors
On 8 August 2011, a new show started entitled Ultimate Police Interceptors, a compilation of the best bits from episodes of the previous series.

Series 1

Series 2

Series 3

Series 4

Compilation shows
The Essex series included Best of Police Interceptors showing highlights of the chases and incidents from the previous programmes.  At the end of series 4, Ultimate Police Interceptors contained highlights from previous shows with updates on the fate of the criminals since the series' first airing.

Police Interceptors: Special Edition
A spin-off to series 2, Police Interceptors: Special Edition, was presented by Natalie Pinkham and Chris Barnes on Fiver (now 5Star) in 2011. This was a follow-up show to the main edition featuring highlights from the chases, interviews with members of the Essex team and the presenters participating in "hands-on" reconstructions and police training exercises. Presenters also took part in incident simulations, like driving a car while a stinger is deployed to puncture the car's tyres.

See also
 Road Wars – series broadcast on Sky1, Sky2 and Pick TV with a similar format and made by the same producers.
 Street Wars – programme broadcast on Sky1, Sky2 and Pick TV which is about police officers "on the beat".
 Brit Cops – similar police show on Sky Livingit (originally on Bravo).
 Traffic Cops – series about traffic police broadcast on Channel 5 and formerly on BBC One.
 Sky Cops – BBC series featuring helicopter police.
 Police Camera Action! – show broadcast on ITV.
 Night Cops – show broadcast on Sky1, Sky2 and Pick.

References

External links
Police Interceptors (Official website)
Police Interceptors (Channel 5)
Police Interceptors (Facebook)

2000s British crime television series
2010s British crime television series
2020s British crime television series
2008 British television series debuts
2000s British reality television series
2010s British reality television series
2020s British reality television series
Channel 5 documentary series
Documentary television series about policing
Television shows set in Essex